Donnybrook is an unincorporated rural community in North Huron, Huron County, Ontario, Canada.

History 
Donnybrook was founded in the 1860s on the corner of what are now Huron County Road 22 and the Glen's Hill Road.
At its peak, it had a hotel, tavern, general store, a blacksmith shop, a woodworking shop, an Orange Lodge and a church. By the end of the 1890s, most of Donnybrook's businesses were closed.  The church survived until 1999, but presently, all that remains in Donnybrook is the church's cemetery.

References 

Communities in Huron County, Ontario
Ghost towns in Ontario